Peter Francis Soteropoulos (born 5 August 1981) is a Greek-American baseball player who competed in the 2004 Summer Olympics.

Biography
A native of Danvers, Massachusetts, Soteropoulos played college baseball at the University of Connecticut. In 2001, he batted .364 with 60 hits, tossed 18 innings on the mound with a 4.50 ERA, and was named a third-team all-Big East Conference selection. After the 2001 season, he played collegiate summer baseball with the Chatham A's of the Cape Cod Baseball League. As a senior at UConn, he was a first-team all-Big East selection, batting .381 with 43 RBI.

In 2003, he was a member of the silver medal-winning Greek National Baseball Team at the 2003 European Baseball Championship. He was selected by the St. Louis Cardinals in the 40th round of the 2003 MLB Draft. He played in the Cardinals' system in 2003 with the New Jersey Cardinals, and in 2004 with the Peoria Chiefs. He competed for the homestanding Greek team in the 2004 Athens Olympics, posting a 0–1 record on the mound.

References

External links

1981 births
Living people
People from Danvers, Massachusetts
American people of Greek descent
Greek baseball players
Olympic baseball players of Greece
Baseball players at the 2004 Summer Olympics
Baseball players from Massachusetts
UConn Huskies baseball players
Chatham Anglers players
Sportspeople from Essex County, Massachusetts